William Radford Coyle (July 10, 1878 –   January 30, 1962) was a Republican member of the U.S. House of Representatives from Pennsylvania.

Biography
William R. Coyle was born in Washington, D.C. He attended Columbian College (now George Washington University) in Washington, D.C. in 1898 and 1899. He was a field assistant in the United States Geological Survey from 1896 to 1899. He attended the Naval War College in Newport, Rhode Island in 1900.

He served in the United States Marine Corps, rising to the rank of captain, from 1900 to 1906. He attended the law department of the University of Pennsylvania at Philadelphia, Pennsylvania in 1906 and 1907.

He moved to Germantown, Pennsylvania in 1906 and to Bethlehem, Pennsylvania, in 1908. He was school director of Bethlehem from 1912 to 1918.  He served as captain of the Fourth Regiment, Pennsylvania National Guard, in 1913, and was commissioned first a captain, and then a major, in the United States Marine Corps in 1918.  He was promoted to lieutenant colonel in 1932.

After World War I, he served as president of the American Wholesale Coal Association in 1921 and 1922, and as a trustee to settle the affairs of the Tidewater Coal Exchange from 1922 to 1925.

Coyle was elected as a Republican to the Sixty-ninth Congress, but was an unsuccessful candidate for reelection in 1926. He was elected to the Seventy-first and Seventy-second Congresses, but was an unsuccessful candidate for reelection in 1932, 1936, and 1942. He was a delegate to the Republican National Conventions in 1936 and 1944.

He served as chairman of civilian defense in Bethlehem from 1941 to 1945. He worked as vice president of Weston Dodson, from 1932 to 1954, and as chairman of Bethlehem Redevelopment Authority from 1953 to 1959.

He died in Bethlehem, aged 83, and is buried in Nisky Hill Cemetery.

See also

 List of United States representatives from Pennsylvania

References
 Retrieved on 2008-02-25
The Political Graveyard

External links
 

1878 births
1962 deaths
American geologists
Columbian College of Arts and Sciences alumni
Naval War College alumni
Military personnel from Pennsylvania
Politicians from Bethlehem, Pennsylvania
United States Marine Corps officers
University of Pennsylvania Law School alumni
American Episcopalians
Republican Party members of the United States House of Representatives from Pennsylvania